Syriac Union Party in Syria (SUP) is a secular Assyrian/Syriac political party in Syria that represents the interests of Assyrians in Syria and is committed to the Dawronoye modernization ideology. Established on 1 October 2005, since the start of the Syrian Civil War it has positioned itself on the side of secular, democratic, socialist and federalist Kurdish forces in Rojava, skeptical of both the Ba'athist Syrian government of Bashar al-Assad and the National Coalition for Syrian Revolutionary and Opposition Forces.

Political role in Jazira Canton of Rojava 

With the start of the Syrian Civil War in 2011, the Syriac Union Party aligned itself with the Kurdish Democratic Union Party (PYD), with which it shares a secular, pro-modernization and direct democracy based ideology. It has three deputies in the Syrian Democratic Council, the legislature of the Autonomous Administration of North and East Syria.

The Syriac Union Party has set up the Syriac Military Council militia as well as the Sutoro police force to protect Assyrian communities in their settlement areas in northeast Syria. Sutoro are integrated with the general Asayish police force of Jazira Region of the Democratic Federation of Northern Syria, however the Qamishli branch later broke away to align itself with the Assad government under the name of Sootoro. The Syriac Military Council has co-operated closely with the mainly Kurdish People's Defense Units (YPG) and later became part of the Syrian Democratic Forces (SDF).

The Deputy Prime Minister of the region is Syriac Christian Elizabeth Gawrie.

Persecution by the Assad government 

The Syriac Union Party has been subject to continued repression by the Assad government during the civil war, despite being part of the nonviolent and officially-tolerated domestic opposition National Coordination Body. On 6 June 2013, government forces raided the Qamishli home of SUP Executive Committee member Rubel Gabriel Bahho, arresting and subsequently imprisoning him. On 12 August 2013, security forces apprehended SUP vice-president Sait Malki Cosar—the father of Sutoro leader Johann Cosar—as he disembarked at Qamishli Airport following a visit to Switzerland, where he holds dual citizenship. After being detained in Qamishli for several days, Cosar was transferred to a prison near Damascus and contact with him was lost. Neither party official is known to have been formally charged or tried in court, and neither has been released or heard from since their imprisonment. Their fates remain unknown as of February 2014.

Cosar is rumoured to have died under shadowy circumstances while in custody. The government produced a death certificate for Cosar that stated he died in Damascus of supposed "cardiac arrest" at either 10:00 or 10:25 PM on the day of his arrest, even though his flight did not even land in Qamishli until 10:30 PM. But despite requests from both the SUP and Cosar's family, government officials have refused to release his body. Cosar's relatives reportedly managed to track down the doctors in Damascus who signed the death certificate, who told them that the government frequently forces doctors to sign death certificates for detainees without allowing them to even see a corpse. Friends, family members, and party colleagues alike believe that Cosar may still be alive, and have alleged that the government is trying to conceal the fact that he has been tortured in custody.

Activities in Europe

On 15 August 2012, members of Syriac Union Party stormed the Syrian embassy in Stockholm in protest of the Syrian government. A dozen of its members were later detained by Swedish police.

See also
Syriac Union Party (Lebanon)
Syriac Military Council
Sutoro

References

External links
Carl Drott: "The Revolutionaries of Bethnahrin", Warscapes, 25 May 2015
Interview with the Chairman of the Syriac National Council (in German)
Die Welt report about the Christian Sutoro militia (in German)

2005 establishments in Syria
Anti-government factions of the Syrian civil war
Assyrian political parties
Assyrians in Syria
Dawronoye
Organizations of the Syrian civil war
Political parties established in 2005
Political parties in Syria
Political parties in the Autonomous Administration of North and East Syria
Political parties of minorities in Syria
Social democratic parties in Asia